Kirton End is a hamlet in the civil parish of Kirton in the Boston district of  Lincolnshire, England.

Kirton End has two Grade II listed buildings, one a disused windmill on Donington Road (B1391). The other a former public house called the Old Windmill on Willington Road.

References

External links

Hamlets in Lincolnshire
Borough of Boston
Kirton, Lincolnshire